Hotel Sessions is an extended play (EP) recording by British-Australian recording artist Olivia Newton-John, released on 8 April 2014. It is her first EP focusing on unreleased songs and was released independently by ONJ Productions, Newton-John's own production company. It was also Newton-John's last album released by that company, before she signed with Sony Music Australia.

Hotel Sessions was first available at Summer Nights, Newton-John's nineteenth concert tour. Physical copies were later available from her official website, together with digital download versions at online shops. The EP is dedicated to Rona Newton-John, Olivia's sister and Brett Goldsmith's mother, who passed on in 2013.

Background and development
The songs featured on Hotel Sessions were recorded over a period of nine years, at hotel rooms which Newton-John stayed during her concert tours. All five songs were produced by Brett Goldsmith, her nephew. Goldsmith previously released a version of "Ordinary Life" on his YouTube account in 2008. Long before Hotel Sessions was released, he also leaked Newton-John's recordings of "Best of My Love", a demo which features a different production of the final track, a Mr. Mister cover "Broken Wings". "Bow River" is another cover song, originally released by Australian band Cold Chisel. Hotel Sessions also features dances remixes of "Broken Wings" and "Best of My Love", made by remixer DayBeat.

Track listing
All songs produced by Brett Goldsmith.

Credits and personnel

Joe Creighton – bass
Lu Lu Foster – typography
Steve George – songwriter
Brett Goldsmith – artwork, producer, songwriter
Mark Hartley – executive producer
David Hornos Esteve – remix
Keith Johnston – booklet art
John Lang – songwriter
Danny McKenna – drums
Natalie Miller – background vocals
Ian Moss – songwriter
Olivia Newton-John – songwriter, vocals
Richard Page – songwriter

Credits adapted from the album's liner notes.

References

External links
 Olivia Newton-John official website > Discography

Olivia Newton-John EPs
2014 EPs